Karl Ferstl (born 31 December 1945) is an Austrian  sailor. He won the Olympic Silver Medal in the 1980 in Star class along with Hubert Raudaschl. He was also the flag bearer for Austria in the 1980 Moscow Olympics.

References

1945 births
Living people
Austrian male sailors (sport)
Olympic sailors of Austria
Sailors at the 1980 Summer Olympics – Star
Sailors at the 1984 Summer Olympics – Star
Olympic silver medalists for Austria
Olympic medalists in sailing
Medalists at the 1980 Summer Olympics